

162001–162100 

|-
| 162001 Vulpius ||  || Melchior Vulpius (c. 1570–1615), a German singer and composer of church music || 
|-id=002
| 162002 Spalatin ||  || George Spalatin (1484–1545) was a German theologian, humanist and historian. In 1502 he went to the University of Wittenberg and had good relations with Martin Luther and to the Reformation. Spalatin was painted by Lukas Cranach, father and son. He died at Altenburg and was buried in the St. Batholomew church. || 
|-id=011
| 162011 Konnohmaru ||  || Konnohmaru is a legendary warrior of the Heiji Rebellion (1159) || 
|-id=035
| 162035 Jirotakahashi ||  || Jiro Takahashi (born 1949), professor of science education at Ehime University || 
|}

162101–162200 

|-id=158
| 162158 Merrillhess ||  || Merrill Hess (born 1955), an amateur astronomer and has been President and Vice-President of the Baton Rouge Astronomical Society many times. || 
|-id=166
| 162166 Mantsch ||  || Paul Mantsch (born 1941), American particle and astro-particle physicist with the Sloan Digital Sky Survey || 
|-id=173
| 162173 Ryugu ||  || Ryūgū-jō (Ryugu), the undersea palace of the dragon deity Ryūjin in Japanese mythology, from where a Japanese fisherman brought back a box with a secret. The naming alludes to the Hayabusa2 asteroid sample return mission. || 
|}

162201–162300 

|-bgcolor=#f2f2f2
| colspan=4 align=center | 
|}

162301–162400 

|-bgcolor=#f2f2f2
| colspan=4 align=center | 
|}

162401–162500 

|-id=466
| 162466 Margon ||  || Bruce Margon (born 1948), American astronomer and a contributor to the Sloan Digital Sky Survey || 
|}

162501–162600 

|-bgcolor=#f2f2f2
| colspan=4 align=center | 
|}

162601–162700 

|-bgcolor=#f2f2f2
| colspan=4 align=center | 
|}

162701–162800 

|-id=755
| 162755 Spacesora ||  || "Space Sora", the non-profit organization who has contributed to the popularization of science, especially astronomy, among children in Ehime prefecture, Japan, since 2008 || 
|}

162801–162900 

|-bgcolor=#f2f2f2
| colspan=4 align=center | 
|}

162901–163000 

|-id=937
| 162937 Prêtre ||  || René Prêtre (born 1957), a Swiss heart surgeon who treats children in both Switzerland and Mozambique. He was voted Swiss of the Year in 2009. || 
|-id=978
| 162978 Helenhart ||  || Helen M. Hart (born 1954), a mission operations analyst at the Applied Physics Laboratory, worked as a Mission Sequencer for the New Horizons mission to Pluto. || 
|}

References 

162001-163000